You Are Right to Be Afraid  is the second release by Indie rock band Beauty Pill. It was released in 2003 on Dischord Records.

Track listing
"The Ballad of Leron And Lele" - 0:34
"Copyists" - 2:34
"You Are Right To Be Afraid" - 3:47
"Quote Devout Unquote" - 5:11
"You, Yes You" - 3:05

Personnel
Chad Clark - Vocals & Guitar
Ryan Nelson - Drums & Guitar
Basla Andolsun - Bass
Drew Doucette - Guitar
Rachel Burke - Vocals, Wurlitzer

References

2003 albums
Beauty Pill albums